Two ships of the Royal Fleet Auxiliary have borne the name RFA Wave Ruler:

  was a  oiler launched in 1946, and scrapped in 1977.
  is a  tanker launched in 2001 and in service as of 2013.

Royal Fleet Auxiliary ship names